Richard Sadiv (born 1964) is an American sports coach and powerlifter. Sadiv Sets are named after him.

Early life and education
Sadiv was born in 1964. He was educated at the Garfield High School. Later, he attended William Paterson University and graduated with a bachelor's degree. He also holds certifications from the National Academy of Sports Medicine and FMS.

Career
In 2010, he joined Parisi Speed School. He is the current director of the NFL Combine program at Parisi Speed School. He has coached athletes such as Brian Toal, Phil Simms, and T. J. Clemmings.

Sadiv acquired Parisi Speed School in 2015 and now owns it.

In 2018, he was inducted into the World Natural Powerlifting Federation (WNPF) Hall of Fame for his career as a powerlifter in which he attained a world record, five national records, and fourteen state records in New Jersey. A year later, he acquired Escape Fitness Fairlawn.

In 2021, Sadiv was inducted into the New Jersey Strength and Power Hall of Fame. He also holds a Guinness Book of Record for the one-hour team deadlift.

As a philanthropist, he was New Jersey Champion of the year for Best Buddies, a program for persons with impairments, with his wife Nanci. He is a former Special Olympics judge.

Recognition
 World Natural Powerlifting Hall of Fame (2018) 
 New Jersey Strength and Power Hall of Fame (2021)

References

Living people
1964 births
American sports coaches
American powerlifters
William Paterson University alumni